The Kharmang Valley, also known as Kartaksho, is one of the five main valleys situated in Gilgit–Baltistan, Pakistan. The area became an individual district in 2015, with its temporary headquarters set at the town of Tolti.

Tourist destinations in the area include Manthokha Waterfall, Khamosh Waterfall  Mehdiabad Valley and Kharmang khas valley. Kharmang is where the Indus River enters Pakistani-controlled territory from the Leh district in Indian-controlled territory.

Etymology 
Kahrmang is a Balti word that consists of two parts (khar means "fort" and mang means "abundant"). The name Kharmang was given to the valley in the era of Ali Sher Khan Anchan, who built many forts in this region because of its strategic importance.

Geography 
According to the Gazetteer of Kashmir and Ladak (1890), Kharmang is an old ilaqa of Baltistan that consists of the right bank of Indus from the border of Ladakh to the village of Pari, and from the source of the Shingo River to the village of Tolti on the left bank of Indus.

Demographics 
Kharmang valley is a populated area. The approximate population is about 20,000 households (approximately 60,000 people); most of the population resides in scattered villages. The main source of income is subsistence livestock rearing for their livelihood and agriculture and unskilled man power working abroad and urban centers of Pakistan. Many Kharmang people work in Gulf countries with a majority in Kuwait, Bahrain and Saudi Arabia. Natives of Kharmang Valley speak Balti ,[Shina] and predominantly follow Shia Islam, with the exception of a few people who belong to Noorbakhshi who live around Mehdi Abad.

See also 
Manthokha Waterfall
Kharmang District
Tomskiy Khutor, Pakistan

References 

Populated places in Kharmang District
Baltistan
Valleys of Gilgit-Baltistan